This is a list of the most expensive football transfer fees paid in Ukraine.

Incoming transfers

Outgoing transfers 

All fees are in United States dollars and are not adjusted for inflation.

References

Football records and statistics in Ukraine
Expensive
Ukraine